Nešović (Cyrillic script: Нешовић) is a Serbian surname. It may refer to:

Aleksej Nešović (born 1985), basketball player
Branko Nešović (1930–2002), footballer and physician
Ivana Nešović (born 1988), volleyball player
Nikola Nešović (born 1993), footballer

Serbian surnames